John David Mabbott (Duns, 18 November 1898 – Islip, Oxfordshire, 26 January 1988) was a British academic who worked as the president of St John's College, Oxford, from 1963 from to 1969.

Education 
Mabbott was educated at Berwickshire High School; the University of Edinburgh; and St John's.

Career 
Mabbott was a lecturer in classics at the University of Reading from 1922 to 1923; and then a Lecturer at the University College of North Wales from 1923 to 1924. He was fellow of St John's from 1924 to 1963; tutor from 1930 to 1956; and senior tutor from 1956 to 1963. He wrote: 'The State and the Citizen', 1948; 'An Introduction to Ethics', 1966; 'John Locke', 1973; and 'Oxford Memories', 1986.

During  World War II, Mabbott was commissioned by the Foreign Office to produce reports on popular transfers after the war, in particular the feasibility of forcible expulsion of ethnic Germans from Poland and Czechoslovakia.

References

People educated at Berwickshire High School
1898 births
1988 deaths
People associated with the University of Reading
Academics of Bangor University
Alumni of the University of Edinburgh
Fellows of St John's College, Oxford
Presidents of St John's College, Oxford
People from Duns, Scottish Borders
Scottish philosophers
20th-century British philosophers